Dance by the Light of the Moon may refer to:

"Dance by the Light of the Moon", a 1960 doo-wop song by The Olympics
"Dance by the Light of the Moon", a 1992 episode of Canadian drama series Forever Knight

See also
By the Light of the Moon (disambiguation)